Pavel Vladimirovich Tabakov (born 12 January 1970) is a Russian football coach and a former player.

External links
 

1970 births
Living people
Soviet footballers
FC Lada-Tolyatti players
Russian footballers
Russian Premier League players
Russian football managers
FC KAMAZ Naberezhnye Chelny players
Association football defenders